It is estimated that Tunisia lost more than US$1 billion per year between 2000 and 2008 due to corruption, bribery, kickbacks, trade mispricing and criminal activities.

The National Constituent Assembly developed an anti-corruption initiative in December 2012 which aims to establish a national integrity system, to promote the independent National Anti-Corruption Authority, and to boost civil society participation in corruption prevention. However, the government's effort is still considered limited. Corruption is still a serious problem yet it is less pervasive when compared to the neighboring countries.

The role of middlemen is very important for doing business in Tunisia, and many investors consider that having the right connections when collaborating on business in order to overcome administrative hurdles to investment and public procurement is crucial. State-owned companies or private groups owned by influential families continue to enjoy a privileged position, with close political and administrative ties and easier access to financing.

On Transparency International's 2022 Corruption Perceptions Index, Tunisia scored 40 on a scale from 0 ("highly corrupt") to 100 ("very clean"). When ranked by score, Tunisia ranked 85th among the 180 countries in the Index, where the country ranked first is perceived to have the most honest public sector.  For comparison, the best score was 90 (ranked 1), the worst score was 12 (ranked 180), and the average score was 43.

See also 
 International Anti-Corruption Academy
 Group of States Against Corruption
 International Anti-Corruption Day
 ISO 37001 Anti-bribery management systems
 United Nations Convention against Corruption
 OECD Anti-Bribery Convention
 Transparency International

References

External links
Tunisia Corruption Profile from the Business Anti-Corruption Portal

 
Tunisia